The following lists events that happened during 1998 in Uganda.

Incumbents
President: Yoweri Museveni 
Vice President: Specioza Kazibwe
Prime Minister: Kintu Musoke

Events

August
 August 6 - Fighting spreads across the Democratic Republic of the Congo and on borders with Rwanda, Uganda and Tanzania. Rwanda continues to deny involvement with the rebels and a summit is held in Zimbabwe discussing the conflict.
 August 10 - Military experts from Namibia, Zimbabwe, Zambia and Tanzania are due in Kinshasa later this week to investigate allegations of Rwandan and Ugandan troops being sent across the border.
 August 21 - South African President Nelson Mandela calls for a summit over the Congo conflict on Saturday, inviting the leaders of DRC, Rwanda, Uganda and Zimbabwe to come.

References

 
1990s in Uganda
Years of the 20th century in Uganda
Uganda
Uganda